Amico Aspertini, also called Amerigo Aspertini, was an Italian Renaissance painter and sculptor whose complex, eccentric, and eclectic style anticipates Mannerism. He is considered one of the leading exponents of the Bolognese School of painting.

Biography
He was born in Bologna to a family of painters (including Giovanni Antonio Aspertini, his father, and Guido Aspertini, his brother), and studied under masters such as Lorenzo Costa and Francesco Francia. He traveled to Rome with his father in 1496, and is briefly documented there again between 1500–1503, returning to Bologna thereafter and painting in a style influenced by Pinturicchio and Filippino Lippi (whose work the critic Roberto Longhi suggested [in Officina ferrarese, 1934] he may have seen in Florence before 1500).  To his Roman years belong at least two collections of drawings, the "Parma Notebook" (Taccuino di Parma) and the Wolfegg Codex.  In Bologna in 1504, he joined Francia and Costa in painting frescoes for the Oratory of Santa Cecilia next to San Giacomo Maggiore, a work commissioned by Giovanni II Bentivoglio.

In 1508-1509, while in exile from Bologna following the fall of the Bentivoglio family, Aspertini painted the splendid frescoes in the Chapel of the Cross in the Basilica di San Frediano in Lucca (a church, like the Oratory of Santa Cecilia, maintained by Augustinian friars).  Aspertini was also one of two artists chosen to decorate a triumphal arch for the entry into Bologna of Pope Clement VII and Emperor Charles V in 1529. He produced sculptures for doors in San Petronio Basilica in Bologna. Aspertini also painted façade decorations (all now lost), and altarpieces. Many of his works are often eccentric and charged in expression. For example, the Pietà he painted inside San Petronio appears to occur in an other-worldly electric sky.

His Tuscan near-contemporary Giorgio Vasari described Aspertini (in The Lives) as having an eccentric, half-insane personality. According to Vasari, he was ambidextrous and worked so rapidly with both hands that he was able to divide chiaroscuro between them, painting chiaro with one hand and scuro with the other. Vasari also quotes Aspertini as complaining that all his Bolognese colleagues were copying Raphael.

He died in Bologna.

Anthology of works
Adoration of the Shepherds - Staatliche Museen, Berlin
Adoration of the Shepherds (1515) - Uffizi, Florence
Domus Aurea, Rome
A Baptismal Ceremony - Vanderbilt University Fine Arts Gallery, Nashville, Tennessee
Frescoes, Oratorio di Santa Cecilia, Bologna
San Frediano, Lucca
San Michele in Bosco, Bologna
Pietà with Saint Mark, Ambrose, John the Evangelist, and Anthony Abbot (1519) -  San Petronio, Bologna)
Saint Sebastian, National Gallery of Art, Washington, DC
Battle of the Amazons (Italy)
Madonna and Child with Saints George, Joseph, John the Evangelist and Sebastian, Museo Nazionale di Villa Guinigi, Lucca
San Giacomo Maggiore, Bologna
Profile of a Hero (1496) - Christian Museum, Esztergom
Madonna Enthroned with Saints, (c. 1515) -  San Martino, Bologna
Holy Family with Saints (after 1530) -  Saint Nicolas des Champs, Paris

References

External links
Web Gallery
Getty Museum Information

References

15th-century Italian painters
Italian male painters
16th-century Italian painters
16th-century Italian sculptors
Painters from Bologna
Renaissance painters
Fresco painters